The Sonata of Silence is a Spanish period drama television series starring Marta Etura, Daniel Grao and Eduardo Noriega. It is an adaptation of the novel of the same name by Paloma Sánchez-Garnica. Produced by RTVE in collaboration with José Frade PC, it aired from September 2016 to November 2016 on La 1.

Premise 
The plot revolves around the life in Madrid of Marta Ribas (Marta Etura). While the presentation of the leading character takes places in 1934, the bulk of the fiction is set in 1946, after the Civil War, a society mired by machismo and the importance of outward appearances. Marta sees herself in a situation she begins to work to support her daughter Elena (Claudia Traisac) after her husband Antonio (Daniel Grao) falls ill, facing the latter's humiliated reaction; she also faces the gossiping of neighbours in relation to a misunderstanding with her neighbour Rafael (Eduardo Noriega), who is actually secretly in love with Marta. However, the job interview to work as personal assistant to an Italian businesswoman, Roberta Moretti (Maria Rosaria Omaggio), will change her present and future.

Cast

Production and release 
The series is an adaptation of the novel La sonata del silencio, authored by Paloma Sánchez-Garnica and a best-selling work in Spain in 2014. It was produced by RTVE in collaboration with José Frade PC. The episodes were directed by Iñaki Peñafiel and Peris Romano, whereas the adapted screenplay was authored by Rodolf Sirera, Peris Romano, Sergio Barrejón, Anaïs Schaaff and Javier Olivares. The score was composed by César Benito.

Filming started by October 2015.

The series, consisting of 9 episodes, premiered in prime time on 13 September 2016 on La 1, the TVE's flagship channel. The broadcasting run ended on 1 November 2016. It averaged unimpressive viewership ratings, with a 10.3% share of audience only slightly above the channel's average.

Episodes

Awards and nominations 

|-
| rowspan = "4" align = "center" | 2017
| Prix Europa Awards || colspan = "2" | Best TV Fiction ||  || 
|-
| 19th Iris Awards || Best Actress || Marta Etura ||  || 
|-
| rowspan = "2" | 5th 
| colspan = "2" | Best Miniseries or TV Movie
| 
| align = "center" rowspan = "2" | 
|-
| Best Male Drama Actor || Eduardo Noriega || 
|}

References 

Television series based on Spanish novels
2016 Spanish television series debuts
2016 Spanish television series endings
2010s Spanish drama television series
Television series set in 1946
La 1 (Spanish TV channel) network series
Television shows set in Madrid
Television shows filmed in Spain
Period television series